Giuseppe Torromino (born 21 June 1988) is an Italian professional footballer who plays for Livorno as a forward or winger.

Club career
After playing in the lower leagues (impressing with Treviso in 2011–12), Torromino joined Serie B side Crotone on 13 July 2012 on a three-year contract.

On 9 September 2012 he made his league debut, coming on as a substitute in a 3–1 home success over Cittadella.

In January 2014 he was signed by Entella. On 28 August 2014 he left for Grosseto. The player returned to Crotone after his subsequent loan spell with Grosseto had expired, and shortly after departed his hometown club for Lecce in August 2016. He gained promotion to Serie B with the giallorossi side in 2017-2018, scoring 5 goals in the league.

On 17 January 2019 he moved to Juve Stabia on a permanent basis.

On 23 August 2019, he signed a 2-year contract with Ternana.

On 29 September 2021, he joined newly reformed Livorno in the amateur levels.

References

External links

1988 births
Living people
Italian footballers
People from Crotone
U.S. Lecce players
Torino F.C. players
Carrarese Calcio players
S.S. Juve Stabia players
Treviso F.B.C. 1993 players
F.C. Crotone players
Virtus Entella players
Ternana Calcio players
Serie B players
Serie C players
Association football forwards
A.S.D. La Biellese players
Footballers from Calabria
Sportspeople from the Province of Crotone